David Alan Simpson is an English botanist born in 1955.

Authority abbreviation

References

Living people
1955 births
English botanists
Date of birth missing (living people)
Place of birth missing (living people)